Dillwynella is a genus of sea snails, marine gastropod mollusks in the family Skeneidae.

The genus name of Dillwynella is in honour of Lewis Weston Dillwyn (1778 – 1855), who was a British porcelain manufacturer, naturalist and Whig Member of Parliament (MP).

Description
The minute, depressed, porcellanous shell has a thin horny operculum. It consists of comparatively few whorls. The shell is imperforate, but with a depression bounded by a riblet in the umbilical rib outside of the columella. The few whorls have a thin fugacious epidermis. The outer lip is thin . The columella has no teeth, projections, or folds, passing smoothly into the anterior margin.

Species
Species within the genus Dillwynella include:
 † Dillwynella aulacophora Cossmann, 1913 
 Dillwynella fallax Hasegawa, 1997
 Dillwynella haptricola B.A. Marshall, 1988
 † Dillwynella houzeaui Cossmann, 1913 
 Dillwynella ingens B.A. Marshall, 1988
 Dillwynella lignicola B.A. Marshall, 1988
 Dillwynella modesta (Dall, 1889)
 Dillwynella planorbis Hasegawa, 1997
 Dillwynella sheisinmaruae Hasegawa, 1997
 † Dillwynella texana G. Harris, 1895 
 Dillwynella vitrea Hasegawa, 1997
 Dillwynella voightae Kunze, 2011

References

 Kunze T. (2011) Dillwynella voightae new species, a new skeneimorph gastropod (Turbinidae) from the western Atlantic and a new record of Dillwynella modesta (Dall, 1889). The Nautilus 125(1): 36-40.

External links

 
Skeneidae